Velvel or Velvl is a Yiddish masculine given name meaning "wolf" in Yiddish.

Velvel is often associated with the tribe of Benjamin, who is described in the Bible as a wolf, i.e. a mighty and fearless warrior (Genesis 49:27). Velvel is often used as a Yiddish form of William or Vladimir.

Given name
 Velvl Greene (1928–2011), Canadian–American–Israeli scientist and academic
 Velvel Kahan (William Morton Kahan), mathematician and computer scientist
 Velvel Pasternak, one of the world's foremost experts on Jewish music
 Velvel Putzer, prominent Russian politician
 Velvel Soloveitchik, son of Rabbi Chaim Soloveitchik of Brisk
 Velvel Zbarjer, a Brody singer (1824–1884)
Verne ("Velvel") Chelin (1927-2013), Canadian pharmacist and businessman who was a global private label innovator

References
 The origin and meaning of common Jewish names at Aish.com
 Velvel at BehindTheName.com

Given names
Masculine given names
Jewish given names
Yiddish words and phrases